Frederick Brock may refer to:

Frederic Edward Errington Brock (1854–1929), English naval officer
Frederick Brock (footballer) (1901–?), English footballer
Frederick W. Brock (1899–1972), Swiss optometrist

See also
Fred Brock (born 1974), American football player